Paulo Alexandre Conde de Matos (born 1 December 1969), known as Paulo Conde, is a retired footballer. Born in Angola prior to its becoming independent from Portugal, he moved first to the metropole and then to Macau, which was Portuguese as well (now a special administrative region of China). Being there, he has played for the senior Macau national team.

Personal life
Conde is the father of Macanese footballer Alex Matos and the two featured in the same league game for Windsor Arch Ka I in 2012; a 1–0 win over Lam Pak. However they were not on the pitch at the same time, as Conde had been substituted at half time, and Matos came on in the 87th minute.

References

1969 births
Living people
Footballers from Luanda
Portuguese footballers
Portuguese sportspeople of Angolan descent
Association football midfielders
Macau footballers
Macau people of Angolan descent
Macau people of Portuguese descent
Windsor Arch Ka I players
Sporting Clube de Macau players
Macau international footballers